Probuzhdane (written Пробуждане in Bulgarian) is the first self-released album by Balkandji. The name means "Awakening" and the band translates it to "Awake". "Probujdane" is also used for a transliteration of the name into English.

It is freely distributed under the Creative Commons Attribution Licence.

Track listing

Personnel
Nikolay Barovsky (Николай Баровски) – Keyboards, kaval, vocals
Vladimir Leviev (Владимир Левиев) – Bass, vocals
Kiril Yanev (Кирил Янев) – Vocals, guitar
Alexander Stoyanov (Александър Стоянов) – drums, vocals, programming, percussions
Lyudmila Barovska (Людмила Баровска) – Bass flugelhorn on Track 3
Dimitar Vasilev (Димитър Василев) – Bass flugelhorn on Track 3
Albena Velikova (Албена Великова) – Vocals on Track 4
Spas Dimitrov (Спас Димитров) – Bass on Track 1 and vocals on Track 1, 2 and 8
Inna Zamfirova (Инна Замфирова) – Vocals on Track 1 and 7
Mihail Kalachev (Михаил Калъчев) – Flute on Track 3
Kristina Morozova (Кристина Морозова) – Vocals on Track 2
Boris Tassev (Борис Тасев) – Trombone on Track 3
Raya Hadzhieva (Рая Хаджиева) – Trumpet on Track 3

References

External links
  Album download.

2001 albums
Balkandji albums